Chicosci is the eponymous fourth album by the Filipino band Chicosci. It was independently released on June 6, 2006 and was repackaged with 3 bonus tracks by Universal-MCA Records Philippines.

Track listing

Music videos from singles

References

2006 albums
Chicosci albums